Lepidochrysops jamesi, the James's blue, is a butterfly of the family Lycaenidae. It is found in South Africa.

The wingspan is 30–36 mm. Adults are on wing from September to early November. There is one generation per year.

Subspecies
 Lepidochrysops jamesi jamesi (Koedoesberg and Swaarweerberg in North Cape)
 Lepidochrysops jamesi claassensi Dickson, 1982 (Hantamsberg in North Cape)

References

Butterflies described in 1971
Lepidochrysops
Endemic butterflies of South Africa